Alana Marshall (born 26 April 1987) is a Scottish female international football midfielder. She currently plays in the Scottish Women's Premier League for Spartans, having previously played for Rangers Ladies, Boroughmuir Thistle and Hibernian Ladies.

Club career
Marshall came through the ranks at Falkirk Ladies.

International career
Marshall was called up to a Scotland training camp for the first time in June 2009, the same week as she was named Scottish Women's Premier League Player of the Year.

References

External links

1987 births
Living people
Scottish women's footballers
Scotland women's international footballers
Footballers from Falkirk
Hibernian W.F.C. players
Women's association football midfielders
Spartans W.F.C. players
Rangers W.F.C. players
Scottish expatriate women's footballers
Scottish expatriate sportspeople in Italy
Expatriate women's footballers in Italy